The Chairman of Pskov Oblast Duma is the presiding officer of the Pskov Oblast Assembly of Deputies.

Office-holders

Sources 

Lists of legislative speakers in Russia
Politics of Pskov Oblast